The 1981–82 New York Islanders season was the 10th season in the franchise's history. It involved winning the Stanley Cup.

Offseason

NHL Draft

Regular season

Season standings

Schedule and results

Pre-season

Regular season

Player statistics

Note: Pos = Position; GP = Games played; G = Goals; A = Assists; Pts = Points; +/- = plus/minus; PIM = Penalty minutes; PPG = Power-play goals; SHG = Short-handed goals; GWG = Game-winning goals
      MIN = Minutes played; W = Wins; L = Losses; T = Ties; GA = Goals-against; GAA = Goals-against average; SO = Shutouts;

Record Winning Streak
From January 21 to February 20 the Islanders set a National Hockey League record by winning 15 consecutive games. Since regular season overtime did not yet exist, all of these games had to be (and were) won in regulation time. During the streak, the Islanders outscored the opposition 97-35 for a +62 goal differential over the 15 games. The record was surpassed in 1993 by the Pittsburgh Penguins, who won 17 consecutive games, two of which were in overtime.

Playoffs

Patrick Division Semi-Finals

Islanders vs. Pittsburgh Penguins
The Islanders won the first two games of the best-of-5 series, outscoring Pittsburgh 15-3. The Penguins then came back to even the series with two victories of their own. In Game 5, the Islanders came from behind to win in overtime. The tying and winning goals were both scored by John Tonelli.
 April 7 Islanders 8, Penguins 1
 April 8 Islanders 7, Penguins 2
 April 10 Penguins 2, Islanders 1(OT)
 April 11 Penguins 5, Islanders 2
 April 13 Islanders 4, Penguins 3(OT)

Islanders win series, 3 games to 2

Patrick Division Finals

Islanders vs. New York Rangers
After losing the opener, their first loss at home since December 29th, the Islanders came back to win the next three games and, eventually, the series in six. The key goals were Bryan Trottier's overtime winner of Game 3 and Dave Langevin's in the third period of Game 6 that proved to be the series clincher.
 April 15 Rangers 5, Islanders 4
 April 16 Islanders 7, Rangers 2
 April 18 Islanders 4, Rangers 3(OT)
 April 19 Islanders 5, Rangers 3
 April 21 Rangers 4, Islanders 2
 April 23 Islanders 5, Rangers 3

Islanders win series, 4 games to 2

Wales Conference Finals

Islanders vs. Quebec Nordiques
The Islanders defeated the Nords decisively in the first two games played at the Nassau Coliseum. In Quebec, they won Game 3 in overtime on a goal scored by Wayne Merrick and finished the sweep three days later to advance to the Finals.
 April 27 Islanders 4, Nordiques 1
 April 29 Islanders 5, Nordiques 2
 May 1   Islanders 5, Nordiques 4(OT)
 May 4   Islanders 4, Nordiques 2

Islanders win series, 4 games to 0

Stanley Cup Finals

New York Islanders vs. Vancouver Canucks
The Canucks had their best chance to win a game in the first one, as a Jim Nill short-handed marker gave them a 5–4 lead with only seven minutes to play in regulation time.  However, the Islanders tied it when Mike Bossy banged home a loose puck after goaltender Richard Brodeur had collided with his own defenceman, Harold Snepsts, while trying to smother it. In the dying seconds of the first overtime period, Snepsts attempted to clear the puck up the middle, but it was intercepted by Bossy, who completed his hat trick with two seconds left on the clock to win the game for the Islanders.  In game two, the Canucks led 4–3 after two periods, but the Isles came back to win again.

The series then shifted to Vancouver, where the Canucks were boosted by a boisterous, towel-waving Vancouver crowd and had a great first period, but failed to score on Billy Smith, who was brilliant.  The Islanders went on to win 3–0, and then completed the sweep with a 3–1 victory on May 16 to win their third straight Cup.

Mike Bossy scored 7 goals in the four games and won the Conn Smythe Trophy.

Islanders win series, 4 games to 0

Awards and records
 Mike Bossy, Conn Smythe Trophy
 Mike Bossy, Runner-Up, Lady Byng Trophy

References
 Islanders on Hockey Database

New York Islanders seasons
New York Islanders
New York Islanders
New York Islanders
New York Islanders
New York Islanders
Eastern Conference (NHL) championship seasons
Patrick Division champion seasons
Stanley Cup championship seasons